The Men's 60 metres hurdles event  at the 2011 European Athletics Indoor Championships was held at March 4 with the final being held on March 4 at 18:50 local time.

Records

Results

Heats
First 2 in each heat and 2 best performers advanced to the Final. The semifinals were held at 16:10.

Final 
The final was held at 18:50.

References 

60 metres hurdles at the European Athletics Indoor Championships
2011 European Athletics Indoor Championships